Dalibor Radujko (born 17 June 1985) is a Slovenian footballer who plays as a midfielder for Swiss club SC Kriens.

Club career
Radujko made his Olimpija Ljubljana debut in September 2010.

Honours
Koper
Slovenian PrvaLiga: 2009–10

References

External links

NZS profile 

1985 births
Living people
Sportspeople from Koper
Slovenian footballers
Association football midfielders
FC Koper players
NK Olimpija Ljubljana (2005) players
NK Rudar Velenje players
S.S. Monopoli 1966 players
A.S.D. Cjarlins Muzane players
SC Kriens players
Slovenian PrvaLiga players
Slovenian Second League players
Serie C players
Serie D players
Swiss Promotion League players
Slovenian expatriate footballers
Expatriate footballers in Italy
Slovenian expatriate sportspeople in Italy
Expatriate footballers in Switzerland
Slovenian expatriate sportspeople in Switzerland